Jacaleapa is a municipality in the Honduran department of El Paraíso.

Municipalities of the El Paraíso Department